Ust-Kazha is a rural locality (a selo) and the administrative center of Ust-Kazhinsky Selsoviet, Krasnogorsky District, Altai Krai, Russia. The population was 697 as of 2013. There are 16 streets.

Geography 
Ust-Kazha is located 37 km north of Krasnogorskoye (the district's administrative centre) by road. Novaya Azhinka is the nearest rural locality.

References 

Rural localities in Krasnogorsky District, Altai Krai